The Clipperton Fracture Zone, also known as the Clarion-Clipperton Zone, is a geological submarine fracture zone of the Pacific Ocean, with a length of around 4500 miles (7240 km). It is one of the five major lineations of the northern Pacific floor, south of the Clarion Fracture Zone, discovered by the Scripps Institution of Oceanography in 1950. The fracture, an unusually mountainous topographical feature, begins east-northeast of the Line Islands and ends in the  Middle America Trench off the coast of Central America. It roughly forms a line on the same latitude as  Kiribati and Clipperton Island.

In 2016, the seafloor in the Clipperton Fracture Zone – an area being researched for deep-sea mining due to the abundant presence of manganese nodule resources – was also found to contain an abundance and diversity of life, with more than half of the species collected being new to science. The zone is sometimes referred to as the Clarion-Clipperton Fracture Zone (CCFZ), with reference to Clarion Island at the northern edge of the zone.

Geography 
The fracture can be divided into four distinct parts:

The first, 127°–113° W, is a broad, low welt of some 900 miles, with a central trough 10 to 30 miles wide;
The second, 113°-107° W, is a volcano enriched ridge, 60 miles wide and 330 miles long;
The third, 107°-101° W, is a low welt with a central trough 1,200–2,400 feet deep which transects the Albatross Plateau; and
The fourth, 101°-96° W, contains the Tehuantepec Ridge which extends 400 miles northeast to the continental margin.

The Nova-Canton Trough is often seen as an extension of the fracture.

Deep sea mining 
The zone, which is administered by the International Seabed Authority (ISA), contains nodules made up of various rare-earth elements dubbed as playing an essential role for the energy transition to a low carbon economy. Further nine areas, each covering , have been set aside for conservation. The International Seabed Authority estimates that the total amount of nodules in the Clarion Clipperton Zone exceeds 21 billions of tons (Bt), containing about 5.95 Bt of manganese, 0.27 Bt of nickel, 0.23 Bt of copper and 0.05 Bt of cobalt. The ISA has issued 19 licences for deep-sea mining exploration within this area. Exploratory full-scale extraction operations are set to begin in late 2021. The ISA are aiming to publish the deep sea mining code in July 2023 though there is contention if they will meet this deadline, commercial licences will be accepted for review thereafter. These nodules are seeded by biogenic processes, micronodules are then further aggregated and accreted into the large clumps targeted for harvesting.

Areas of the fracture zone that have been licensed for mining are home to a diversity of deep-sea xenophyophores, with a 2017 study finding 34 species new to science in the area. As xenophyophores are highly sensitive to human disturbances, deep-sea mining may have adverse effects on the group; further, as they play a keystone role in benthic ecosystems their removal could amplify ecological consequences. Research is being conducted by different research organisations, including Massachusetts Institute of Technology and TU Delft, who have observer status in the International Seabed Authority, in order to fully investigate the potential impact of collecting these elements and compare it to the extensively researched environmental and human impact of terrestrial mining, with the intention of mitigating these impacts through policy. It is currently unknown how the release of tailings from nodule processing into the water column would affect pelagic organisms or the detrimental effects they may have on the benthic communities below.

Environmental concerns about deep sea mining 
Deep sea mining has the potential for large impacts on the environment, specifically the polymetallic nodules found in this area are considered "critical for food web integrity". In April 2021 scientists from JPI oceans project travelled to the CCZ to carry out more in depth studies into the mining technology and its possible effect on the seabed. Major NGO's and governments have called for a moratorium on deep sea mining within the deep sea until more is known about potential environmental impacts.

References

Fracture zones
Pacific Ocean
Mining
Environmental conservation